WVJC (89.1 FM) "89.1 The Bash"  is a radio station broadcasting an alternative format. Licensed to Mount Carmel, Illinois, United States, the station serves the Evansville, Indiana tri-state region. The station is currently owned by Illinois Eastern Community Colleges. Students in the Radio/TV and Digital Media program at Wabash Valley College staff the station.

References

External links
/ 89.1 The Bash

VJC
Mount Carmel, Illinois
Radio stations established in 1983